Udayavani ("Morning Voice" in Kannada) is a Kannada daily newspaper with editions from Manipal, Bengaluru, Mumbai, Hubballi, Davanagere and Gulbarga. Launched in January 1970 by Mohandas Pai and T. Satish U Pai, Udayavani with a combined circulation exceeding 3,00,000 copies as per ABC Jun–Dec 2012 is widely read in coastal Karnataka. It has also substantial circulation in Bengaluru and other centers.

Background 
Udayavani is published by Manipal Media Network Limited promoted by The Manipal Group – a diversified multi-industry conglomerate headquartered at Manipal, Udupi District, Karnataka.

Sister publications 
Manipal Media Network Ltd. also publishes
Roopatara, a cinema monthly magazine, in Kannada
Taranga, a family weekly magazine, in Kannada
Tunturu, an illustrated children's magazine, in Kannada
Tushara, a monthly magazine, in Kannada

See also
 List of Kannada-language newspapers
 List of Kannada-language magazines
 List of newspapers in India
 Media in Karnataka
 Mangalore
 Media of India

References

Newspapers published in Bangalore
Kannada-language newspapers
Newspapers published in Mumbai
Manipal Education and Medical Group
1970 establishments in Mysore State
Publications established in 1970